Helcystogramma arulensis is a moth in the family Gelechiidae. It was described by Rebel in 1929. It is found in Italy, Switzerland, Austria, Hungary, the Czech Republic, Slovakia, Romania, Ukraine and Russia.

The wingspan is 13–14 mm. The forewings are dark brown, the veins broadly suffused with blackish scales and with a dot at the end of the cell. The hindwings are somewhat darker, with a blackish line.

References

Moths described in 1929
arulensis
Moths of Europe